Sim Tze Tzin (born 6 February 1976) is a Malaysian politician who has served as the Member of Parliament (MP) for Bayan Baru since May 2013. He served as the Deputy Minister of Agriculture and Agro-based Industry in the Pakatan Harapan (PH) administration under former Prime Minister Mahathir Mohamad and former Minister Salahuddin Ayub from July 2018 to the collapse of the PH administration in February 2020. He is a member of Parliamentary Special Select Committee for International Affairs. He also served as Member of the Penang State Legislative Assembly (MLA) for Pantai Jerejak from March 2008 to May 2013. He is a member and Strategy Director of the People's Justice Party (PKR), a component party of the PH opposition coalition. He also served as the political secretary to Anwar Ibrahim, Prime Minister, Chairman of PH and President of PKR.

Early life
Sim was born in George Town, Penang and attended Hu Yew Seah School for his primary education, later moving on to Chung Ling High School. In 1996, he joined the Reserve Army, and became a Junior Lieutenant in 1999. His interest in politics began after the Tiananmen Square protests of 1989 and the Oslo Accord, which he says contributed to his "political awakening". In 1998, he joined the Reformasi movement initiated by Anwar, and founded the Malaysia Youth and Students Democratic Movement (DEMA) "to promote democratic awareness among Malaysian citizens and to protest against the University and University College Act".

He graduated with a Bachelor of Engineering with Honours from Universiti Teknologi Malaysia in 1999. While he was there, he became the first non-Malay elected to the UTM Students' Representative Council, winning over 9,000 votes. He later obtained a Masters of Science (Civil) in Highway Engineering from San José State University, while working full time in California as a highway design engineer from 2001 to 2006. While in the United States, Sim founded the Malaysia Forum Organization in Stanford University, a group promoting civil society and discussion of Malaysian issues.

Political career
After five years working in the US, Sim returned to Malaysia and joined PKR. Working under Anwar, he played a significant role in the release of a video clip purporting to show the fixing of judicial appointments and court decisions. He was later named as a witness for the Royal Commission of Inquiry into the Lingam Video Clip, but as of March 2008 has not been called to testify.

In the 2008 general election, Sim contested in the Penang state constituency of Pantai Jerejak under the PKR ticket. He won by a majority of 1,258 votes. He was one of four major players in the Lingam video clip scandal who won election – the others were Loh Gwo Burne (elected as MP for Kelana Jaya), Wee Choo Keong (elected as MP for Wangsa Maju), and Sivarasa Rasiah (elected as MP for Subang).

In the 2013 general election, Sim contested the parliamentary seat of Bayan Baru instead and won to be a Member of Parliament. He contested again the parliamentary seat in the 2018 general election and won to retain it. He was appointed as the Deputy Minister of Agriculture and Agro-based Industry in July 2018 by the new PH formed federal government then.

Controversies and issues

Lingam's case witnesses were not called
He is one of the witnesses in the Lingam video clip case. But on January 28, 2008, the royal commission investigating Lingam's video clip had decided not to summon him to testify on the clip's investigation because according to Tan Sri Haidar Mohd Noor, the Commission's chairman, the evidence to be given them was irrelevant to the investigation which is run.

Urged Zahrain to vacate the Bayan Baru parliamentary seat
On March 14, 2010, he sent a total of 2,108 signatures collected within two days from voters around the Bayan Baru market and the Fairgrounds in Sungai Nibong, Penang to Bayan Baru's independent MP Datuk Zahrain Mohamed Hashim and urged him to vacate his seat before The House of Commons convened on 15 March 2010.

Personal life
Sim is married.

Election results

See also

 Bayan Baru (federal constituency)

References

External links
 
 Malaysia Forum
 ADUN Pantai Jerejak

1976 births
Living people
People from Penang
Malaysian politicians of Chinese descent
Malaysian engineers
People's Justice Party (Malaysia) politicians
Members of the Dewan Rakyat
Members of the Penang State Legislative Assembly
University of Technology Malaysia alumni
San Jose State University alumni
21st-century Malaysian politicians
Malaysian people of Teochew descent